Breitinger is a German surname. Notable people with the surname include:

Heinrich Breitinger (1832–1889), Swiss literary historian and philologist
Hilarius Breitinger (1907–1994), German Franciscan prelate
Johann Jakob Breitinger (1701–1776), Swiss philologist and writer

German-language surnames